Joachim Havikhagen (born 5 September 1991) is a Norwegian snowboarder who competes for Geilo IL. He represented Norway at the 2010 Winter Olympics in Vancouver.

References

External links

1991 births
Living people
Norwegian male snowboarders
Olympic snowboarders of Norway
Snowboarders at the 2010 Winter Olympics